Tadas Kijanskas (born 6 September 1985, in Vilnius) is a Lithuanian international footballer who currently plays as a defender for Hapoel Umm al-Fahm in the Israel National League, the second Israeli league.

Honours
 1x A Lyga Winner (2006) with FBK Kaunas.

Career

Club
In June 2010, he joined Jagiellonia Białystok on a one-year contract.

In July 2011, he signed a two-year contract with Korona Kielce.

In June 2013, he signed to Hapoel Haifa

International
He is a part of Lithuania national football team.
Kijanskas scored an own goal in a 1–3 defeat to Spain.

References

External links
 
 

1985 births
Living people
Footballers from Vilnius
Lithuanian footballers
Lithuania international footballers
Lithuanian expatriate footballers
FK Kareda Kaunas players
FBK Kaunas footballers
FK Šilutė players
FK Vėtra players
FK Sūduva Marijampolė players
Jagiellonia Białystok players
Korona Kielce players
Hapoel Haifa F.C. players
FC Zbrojovka Brno players
Hapoel Ashkelon F.C. players
Hapoel Umm al-Fahm F.C. players
A Lyga players
Ekstraklasa players
Israeli Premier League players
Czech First League players
Liga Leumit players
Expatriate footballers in Poland
Lithuanian expatriate sportspeople in Poland
Expatriate footballers in Israel
Lithuanian expatriate sportspeople in Israel
Expatriate footballers in the Czech Republic
Lithuanian expatriate sportspeople in the Czech Republic
Association football central defenders